John M. (Jack) Hennessy is an American financier and philanthropist. The son of John F. Hennessy and Octavia Tanksley, he was born on May 5, 1936 in Boston, Massachusetts.

He was educated at the Roxbury Latin School, Harvard University (where he graduated magna cum laude), and the MIT Sloan School of Management. He and his wife, Margarita, divide their time among Nassau, Bahamas, London, England, where
their daughter and son-in-law live, and Tuxedo Park, New York, where their son, daughter-in-law, and three grandchildren live.

Career

Citibank 
After college in 1958, Hennessy joined The First National Citibank, working in New York and South America. He eventually became the head of the bank's West Coast of S.A. operations centered in Lima, Peru at the age of 28.

The U.S. Treasury 

After returning to school at MIT for two years, in September 1970, Hennessy joined the United States Department of the Treasury as Deputy Assistant Security, responsible for International Economic Development. On May 2, 1972, he was sworn in as Assistant Secretary for International Affairs, a Presidential appointment requiring the consent and approval of the United States Senate.

The First Boston Corp, Credit Suisse First Boston (CSFB), Credit Suisse 

In July 1974, Hennessy left the United States Department of the Treasury U.S. Treasury  to join First Boston, one of wall street's leading investment banking firms at the time. He spent the rest of his career in the firm, which subsequently was acquired by Credit Suisse. In 1982, he became Chairman and CEO of the joint
venture CSFB, Ltd., London. In 1989, he became  Chairman of Executive Committee and CEO  of the merged  global bank, Credit Suisse First Boston.
he retired from the Bank to dedicate himself to philanthropic and not-for-profit activities, concentrating on education and programs in developing nations.

Other 

Board Member, Corning Inc. and Chairman of the Finance Committee, 1989–2008
Member of the Advisory  Board of the Federal Reserve Bank of New York, 1990–2001
Member of the Twin Towers Fund to compensate the victims of 9/11/2001,  2001–2002
Trustee, The Appeal of Conscience Foundation, (1992–2020)
Chairman, The Economic Club of New York, 2004–2006
Member, Massachusetts Institute of Technology | MIT Corporation, 1990–2000
Trustee, George Bush Presidential Library | George H. W. Bush Presidential Library Foundation, 1994– Present
Independent Inquiry (Volcker)  Committee into United Nations  Oil-for-Food Programme| Oil for Food Iraq program, led team to set up Baghdad  office, May & August 2004
Co-Chairman, Safe Water Network, Inc., founded by Paul Newman to provide clean water to villages in Africa and India, 2005–2010
Advisory Board Member  and Inaugural  Speaker, The Legatum Center for Entrepreneurship and Development at Massachusetts Institute of Technology| MIT, 2008–2018
Chairman, Care Corporate Council 
Member  of the Visiting Committee, Harvard University, 1988–1993
Trustee, Roxbury Latin School, 1975–1980; 1990–1995
Board Member, American Friends of Eton College  2008–2018
Trustee, Manhattan Institute for Policy Research| The Manhattan Institute, 1991–2001
Co-Chairman, Shakespeare's Globe Centres| Shakespeare Globe Center USA, 1989

Awards and Distinctions 

Exceptional Service Award United States Department of the Treasury| U.S. Treasury (1974)
Corporate  Leadership Award, Massachusetts Institute of Technology| MIT, (1987)
Commencement Speaker, Yale School of Management|Yale University School of Management, (1994)
Member of 5-man Blue-ribbon panel|Blue Ribbon Committee on Future of Asian Development Bank, Chair Amartya Sen, Nobel Laureate (1988)
Honoree, New York Boy Scouts of America (1994)
Honoree, first Annual Award Dinner of Student Sponsorship (program  for mentoring and financing failing  NYC public  students in Catholic schools) (2000)

Philanthropy 

Established scholarships for Latin American students at Harvard University (3 students each year) and Massachusetts Institute of Technology|MIT (4 students each year)
Established International Exchange and Travel program, Jarvis international lecture series, and program for 1 student to attend Eton College for 1 year post graduate studies
President, Margarita and John Hennessy Family Foundation – grants for education and related initiatives

References 

MIT Sloan School of Management alumni
Roxbury Latin School alumni
People from Boston
American financiers
American philanthropists
Harvard University alumni
1936 births
Living people